Jon Engen-Helgheim  (born 21 August 1981) is a Norwegian politician from the Progress Party. 
He currently serves as a deputy member to the Storting since 2021, and was a representative to the Storting from 2017 to 2021.

References

1981 births
Living people
Progress Party (Norway) politicians
Members of the Storting
Buskerud politicians
21st-century Norwegian politicians